William Blades (5 December 182427 April 1890), English printer and bibliographer, was born at Clapham, London.

Career 

In 1840 he was apprenticed to his father's printing business in London, being subsequently taken into partnership. The firm was afterwards known as Blades, East & Blades. His interest in printing led him to make a study of the volumes produced by William Caxton's press, and of the early history of printing in England.

His Life and Typography of William Caxton, England's First Printer, was published in 1861–1863, and the conclusions which he set forth were arrived at by a careful examination of types in the early books, each class of type being traced from its first use to the time when, spoilt by wear, it passed out of Caxton's hands. Some 450 volumes from the Caxton Press were thus carefully compared and classified in chronological order.

In 1877 Blades took an active part in organizing the Caxton celebration, and strongly supported the foundation of the Library Association. He was a keen collector of old books, prints and medals. His publications relate chiefly to the early history of printing. The Enemies of Books was his most popular work, being produced in 1880. He was elected as a member to the American Philosophical Society in 1882.

On his death, his library was acquired by the St Bride Foundation as the initial collection of the library. The architect of the St Bride Foundation building, Robert Cunningham Murray, created a room to house the collection that was a near replica of Blade's original library.

Death 

He died at Sutton in Surrey on 27 April 1890.

References

Attribution:

External links
 
 
 

1824 births
1890 deaths
People from Clapham
English printers
English bibliographers
Historians of printing
19th-century English businesspeople